Mukne Dynasty or Mukane Dynasty (also spelled as Mukna, Mookna, Mookne, and Mukni) was the ruling dynasty of the Jawhar State. Koli chief Jayabha Mukne founded it in the middle of the 14th century. It traces its origin from Mukane. The Mukne Dynasty ruled Jawhar for six hundred years, up until 1947.

Rulers

Naik (Nayaka or Polygar) 
 1343 – 1400 Jayabha Mukne (Nayak Jagappa Mukne)

Raja and Shah (Recognised by Muhammad bin Tughluq) 
 1400 – 1422 Nem Shah Mukne-I (Dulbarao) Mukne
 1422 – 1435 Bhimshah (Bhimrao) Mukne
 1435 – 1490 Deobar Rao Mukne (Mohamedshah) Mukne
 1490 – 15** Krishnashah - I Krishnarao Mukne
 15** – 1600 Nemshah - II Mukne
 1640 – 1678 Vikram Shah Mukne - I
 1678 – 1792 Patangshah - I Mukne
 1792 – 17** Krishnashah - II Malojirao Mukne
 17** – 1798 Vikramshah - II Gangadharrao Mukne
 1798 – 1821 Vikramshah - III
 1821 – Jun 1865  Patangshah - III Hanumantrao Mukne
 29 Jun 1865 - Jul 1865  Vikramshah - IV Madhavrao Mukne
 Jul 1865 – 1905  Patangsha - IV Vikramshah Mukne
 1905 – 1917  Patangshah - IV Malharrao Mukne

His Highness Raja 
 1917 – 10 Dec 1927  Martand Rao Mukne (Vikramshah - V) (b. ... – d. 1927)

His Highness Maharaja 
 10 Dec 1927 – 15 Aug 1947 Yashwantrao Martandrao Mukne  (Patangshah V) (b. 1917 – d. 1978)

References 

Dynasties of India
14th-century establishments in India
Koli people